Sze-kar Wan is a Chinese-American New Testament scholar.

Biography 
Wan was born in China and received his early education in Hong Kong. He moved to the United States when he was 15, received his AB from Brandeis University (1975), M.Div. from Gordon-Conwell Theological Seminary (1982), and his Th.D. from Harvard University Divinity School (1992). He taught New Testament at Andover Newton Theological School, before becoming Professor of New Testament at Perkins School of Theology, Southern Methodist University. He is ordained as a priest in the Episcopal Church and has been a member of the editorial board for the Journal of Biblical Literature.

Along with his work in New Testament studies and the use of the Bible in China, Wan is considered part of the first generation of scholars attempting to articulate a unique Asian American biblical hermeneutics, and is a founding member of the Ethnic Chinese Biblical Colloquium.

Works

References 

Living people
American people of Chinese descent
American biblical scholars
New Testament scholars
Harvard Divinity School alumni
Southern Methodist University faculty
Year of birth missing (living people)